Sara Errani and Roberta Vinci were the defending champions, but chose not to participate this year.
First-time pairings Casey Dellacqua and Yaroslava Shvedova won the title, defeating Garbiñe Muguruza and Carla Suárez Navarro in the final, 6–3, 6–7(4–7), [10–5].

Seeds
The top four seeds receive a bye into the second round.

Draw

Finals

Top half

Bottom half

References 
Main Draw

Women's Doubles